The New Zealand EF class locomotive (originally Class 30) is a class of  electric locomotives that operate on the North Island Main Trunk (NIMT) between Palmerston North and Te Rapa in New Zealand.

Background

Electrification of the NIMT was first proposed as early as 1918 due to coal shortages during World War I and later was proposed in the 1950s when diesel locomotives started to replace steam. The section between Wellington and Paekakariki was electrified in 1938 at 1500 V DC to prevent steam build-up in the long Tawa tunnels under the Wellington hills and to provide banking on the steep seaside section from Paekakariki up to Pukerua Bay. This electrification has since been extended further north to Paraparaumu in 1983 and again to Waikanae in 2011.

Following the oil shocks of the 1970s, the National government, led by Prime Minister Robert Muldoon, launched the "Think Big" energy development projects. One of the projects involved the electrification of the  central section of the NIMT between Palmerston North and Te Rapa, approved in 1980. This section was chosen for the topography of the line between these two cities, and the advantages electric locomotives had over diesel in this area. The  DX class diesel-electric locomotives, then the mainstay of the NIMT and only recently introduced themselves, could handle 720-tonne freight trains on the section, but could only average  when climbing the 1 in 52 gradients of the Raurimu Spiral. Electric trains also had advantages during the 1970s oil shocks as New Zealand relied on imported oil to supply its diesel locomotives. Meanwhile, New Zealand's electricity supply is mainly generated from renewable hydroelectricity (hydroelectricity generated 84.5% of New Zealand's electricity in 1980), and therefore electric trains do not have to rely on imported oil to operate.

Classification
Initially, the locomotives were classified as "EAC" in planning documents. During the contracting process, some memorandum referred to the locomotives as E30. When the class began entering service, they were classified as "Class 30." In 1989, this changed again to EF.

Service

Introduction
The electrification of the central section began in 1984, with the government setting aside NZ$40 million to purchase a fleet of  locomotives to operate the new electrified line. Specifications for the locomotives were released in 1983. The contract to build 22 electric locomotives was awarded to Brush Traction of Loughborough, England in 1984. The first two, numbered 30007 and 30013, arrived in 1986 and were used in the testing of the new electrification system, while the remaining 20 locomotives were introduced after the electrification of the NIMT was completed.

They also feature the unusual wheel arrangement of Bo-Bo-Bo, which had been previously used on the EW class electric locomotives and the DJ class diesel-electric locomotives. The advantage of using the Bo-Bo-Bo arrangement over the traditional Co-Co arrangement is that it provides greater flexibility for New Zealand's lightly laid and sharply curved tracks, resulting in less wear on the rails.

The locomotives are supplied electricity from  overhead lines. These lines draw electricity from New Zealand's national grid at four locations along the electrified section: Bunnythorpe, Tangiwai, Taumarunui, and Hamilton. The locomotives are fitted with regenerative braking as well as regular air brakes, so the traction motors can be turned into generators when the locomotive is coasting downhill and feed electricity back into the overhead lines and the national grid.

The EF class were nicknamed "Toasters" or "Shoe Boxes" by New Zealand rail enthusiasts due to their boxy shape.

In service
The EF class were first used to haul freight trains along the central section of the NIMT, with the completion of electrification in 1988. Freight trains travelling from Auckland would be diesel-hauled to Te Rapa, change there to an EF locomotive and be hauled to Palmerston North where they would be changed back to a diesel locomotive to continue to Wellington. This remains the practice today, although trains that do not traverse the length of the central section (such as pulp trains from Karioi mill) are entirely diesel-hauled to save switching the locomotives. Similarly, freight trains that are destined for or originate from the Marton - New Plymouth Line are diesel-hauled for 30 km section of the NIMT between Palmerston North and Marton.

The locomotives had a number of teething issues when first introduced. After two years in service, two locomotives were withdrawn due to transformer failures, and converters were found to be unreliable and required replacing. The locomotives also suffered from longitudinal oscillation at low speed and required dampers to be fitted. This work was completed under warranty from Brush, after New Zealand Railways withheld the final payment of $44 million to Brush pending a solution to the locomotives' problems. As a result, fleet availability was poor, only 73% in October 1989, well below the target of 90% availability. 

The locomotives transformer issues continued, and an upgrade program was undertaken over 1993 and 1994 which saw the 20 remaining locomotives receive upgraded transformers and overhauled traction motors. This work was undertaken at the Hutt Workshops with EF30007 the first to be treated after having been out of action for some time prior. Legal disputes between Brush and New Zealand Rail (as it was by then) were settled in the early 1990s.

Prior to the Stratford–Okahukura Line being mothballed usual operating practice was for the services originating from Auckland or Hamilton and Stratford to meet at Taumarunui and exchange trains there, with an EF regularly hauling the Hamilton-Taumarunui-Hamilton legs. With the mothballing of this line most services now run direct between Palmerston North and Te Rapa.

Electric-hauled passenger services originated later, due to the then daylight NIMT service, the Silver Fern, utilising diesel-electric railcars. When the locomotive-hauled Overlander daylight service replaced the Silver Fern in December 1991, EF class locomotives began to be used to haul it across the central section, and later, the locomotives were used on the overnight Northerner passenger service until it was cancelled in November 2004. The EFs were not used initially on the Northern Explorer, KiwiRail experimented for a short while with towing the whole consist - including the diesel locomotive - over the central section. The need for the EF locomotives for freight services curtailed this.

Despite the NIMT railway electrification and the Auckland railway electrification being built to the same voltage specifications (25kV AC at 50Hz), the EF class could not be used on Auckland's network due to that network requiring higher fault current tolerances than the NIMT. In order to run on Auckland's network, the EF class would require upgraded rectifiers.

Only heavy repairs are undertaken at the main Hutt Workshops near Wellington which, due to the non-electrified section between Palmerston North and Waikanae (and Wellington's electrification being DC rather than AC), the locomotives must be towed by a diesel engine to access the workshops. All other work is carried out in Palmerston North.

In July 2010, EF 30065 and EF 30128 were assessed for a return to service, having been held in open storage (along with EF 30186) for many years at Palmerston North as surplus to operational requirements. It is hoped that reinstating the locomotives will help to ease pressure on the working fleet, especially as locomotives are currently regularly out of service for maintenance, modification and re-branding. EF 30065 was placed on second-hand bogies and moved to Hutt Workshops in August 2010 to begin the assessment, followed by EF 30186 in September. EF 30128 followed to Wellington in April 2011. It is anticipated that one of the locomotives will serve as a parts source to return the other two to service and the remaining hulk scrapped.

All EFs went through a minor upgrade to ensure reliability before a full overhaul is carried out. The upgrade included replacing the obsolete Locolog event recorder and vigilance system with the latest generation system known as Tranzlog. This system also includes fault recording.

EF 30013 was fitted with a replacement air compressor as a trial during 2012, which all locomotives will now receive. The original compressor has become uneconomic to rebuild and is becoming increasingly difficult to keep functioning. These locomotives can be recognised by a new louver being fitted to 2B side of the locomotive.

Withdrawal and disposal
Seven EF class locomotives have been withdrawn from service:

EFs 30036 and 30088 were withdrawn from service following a derailment caused by a washout at Oio (north of Raurimu) on 7 August 1991 that also killed the locomotive engineer. After recovery from the site, the two heavily damaged locomotives were stored at Hutt Workshops until the decision was made that it was both uneconomic to repair the units and they would be surplus to existing requirements. Both were scrapped at Hutt Workshops in April 2003 and February 2007 respectively. Usable salvaged parts had been stripped to support the remainder of the fleet. 30007 was laid up during the mid-1990s but was returned to service not long after.

EFs 30065, 30128 and 30186 were laid up in late 1990s and were in long-term storage at Palmerston North as surplus to operational requirements. All three were moved to Hutt Workshops in 2010. Two other EF locos were withdrawn - 30111 was withdrawn in late 2015 due to requiring an air compressor change, but due to it being surplus at the time KiwiRail used it's Bogies for another EF. 30157 was withdrawn after catching fire in 2015. Both locomotives are stored in Palmerston North.

In December 2016, it was announced that the EF class locomotives would be withdrawn over a two-year period and replaced by DL class locomotives, with the overhead lines remaining in place should the need for electric traction arise in the future. EFs 30163 and 30249 were removed from service in the first quarter of 2018, and EFs 30128 and 30186 were scrapped at Hutt Workshops in during the weeks of late-July and early-August 2021.

Overhauls
Following the 2017 general election KiwiRail and the new Labour-led Coalition Government announced on 30 October 2018 that capital funding would be made available to refurbish 15 of the locomotives at the Hutt Workshops, extending the service life by 10 years for their continued use on the NIMT electrification in line with the new Government's energy and emissions policies. EF30226 and EF30163 were transferred to the Hutt Workshops via the Wairarapa Line in November 2019 for overhaul by KiwiRail in collaboration with original manufacturer Brush Traction, now a subsidiary of Wabtec. By this stage only eight remained in service.

As at December 2020, work on the first locomotive, EF30226, had commenced at Hutt Workshops. It had been repainted in a new yellow and blue livery and named Tekapo. KiwiRail had indicated in a Ministerial Briefing that the overhaul of the 15 EF locomotives should be completed in 2023. The 2022 - 2024 Statement of Corporate Intent (SCI) now has a 2022 target for the first refurbished EF to re-enter service and a 2024 target for the last

The first overhauled locomotive, EF30163, was presented at Hutt Workshops on 8 June 2022 to the media and Transport Minister Michael Woods. The locomotive is painted in a blue livery prior to being towed and commissioned in Palmerston North. The initial plan was to overhaul 12 of the remaining 15 EF locomotives. KiwiRail's acting CEO stated the company would refurbish as many of the locomotives as its budget would allow.

After extensive testing and ironing out of issues with its control system, EF30163 began hauling revenue services in November 2022.

Outside New Zealand
The EF class design was used as the basis for the Eurotunnel Class 9 locomotives used in the Channel Tunnel by the Eurotunnel Shuttle service that was also built by Brush Traction and was scaled up to the standard rail gauge and larger loading gauge used in Europe.

References

Citations

Bibliography

 
 
 
 
 

Electric locomotives of New Zealand
3 ft 6 in gauge locomotives of New Zealand
Bo′Bo′Bo′ locomotives
Bo-Bo-Bo locomotives
Brush Traction locomotives
25 kV AC locomotives
Railway locomotives introduced in 1988